Cartoon Quest was the name of a block of mostly animated television shows  that aired on the Sci Fi Channel starting in 1992. Similar to USA's Cartoon Express, it featured reruns of various older cartoons interspersed with interstitial segments; in this case, focusing on a live-action family (all clad in loincloths) exploring a strange region. During its run, the block aired every Saturday from 7:00 AM to 11:00 AM EST.

This block ended in 1995, and was replaced by The Animation Station.

Programming
Shows aired the first season of Cartoon Quest are:
Captain Scarlet and the Mysterons
Defenders of the Earth
Fantastic Voyage
The New Adventures of Flash Gordon
Return to the Planet of the Apes
Star Trek: The Animated Series
Stingray
The Transformers

The following year and further on:
Back to the Future: The Animated Series
Bionic Six
The Funny Company
Galaxy High
Here Comes the Grump
Journey to the Center of the Earth
Land of the Lost
Lazer Patrol
Little Shop
The New Adventures of Gigantor
Robotech
Ronin Warriors
Star Wars: Droids
Star Wars: Ewoks
Terrahawks

References

See also
The Animation Station
S.C.I.F.I. World

Television programming blocks in the United States
Syfy original programming